, 35 places are heritage-listed in the Shire of Murchison, of which four are on the State Register of Heritage Places which is maintained by the Heritage Council of Western Australia.

List

State Register of Heritage Places
The Western Australian State Register of Heritage Places, lists the following four state registered place within the Shire of Murchison:

Shire of Murchison heritage-listed places
The following places are heritage listed in the Shire of Murchison but are not State registered:

References

Murchison
Shire of Murchison